Jinnah International Airport , formerly Drigh Road Airport or Karachi Civil Airport, is Pakistan's busiest international and domestic airport, and handled 7,267,582 passengers in 2017–2018. Located in Karachi, the largest city and commercial capital of Pakistan and capital of the province of Sindh, it is named after Muhammad Ali Jinnah, the statesman founder of Pakistan.

The airport is managed by the Pakistan Civil Aviation Authority (CAA), and serves as a hub for the national flag carrier, Pakistan International Airlines (PIA), airblue, and many other private airlines. The airport is equipped with aircraft engineering and overhauling facilities including the Ispahani Hangar for wide-body aircraft.

History

Imperial Airways was one of the first airlines to fly to Karachi in December 1926; back then Pakistan was a part of British India.

J. R. D. Tata, the father of civil aviation in British India made the maiden voyage from Juhu Aerodrome in Bombay (now Mumbai) to Drigh Road airstrip (now Jinnah International Airport), Karachi, via Ahmedabad, on 15 October 1932 carrying mail in a Puss Moth aircraft.

During the late 1920s and early 1930s, there was a large black coloured airship hangar at the site of Karachi Airport, constructed for the British HMA R101, at the time, the largest aircraft ever built. Only three hangars were ever built in the world to dock and hangar Britain's fleet of passenger airships. However, the R101 never arrived in Karachi (then part of the British Raj) as it crashed and exploded just 8 hours into its maiden flight over Beauvais, France, killing all but 6 of its 54 passengers and crew. This hangar was so huge that aircraft often used it as a visual marker while attempting VFR landings at Karachi. Over the years, the hangar became known as the landmark of Karachi, until it was demolished by order of then-President Ayub Khan in the 1960s.

During World War II, Karachi Airport was a major transhipment base for United States Army Air Forces units and equipment being used by Tenth Air Force in eastern India, Burma and the Fourteenth Air Force in China. Several operational bomber and fighter units flew into Karachi for short organisational periods prior to their deployment. Air Technical Service Command had extensive facilities where aircraft were received, assembled and tested prior to being flown to their combat units at forward airfields. It also functioned as a major maintenance and supply depot for both air forces. In addition, Air Transport Command flew numerous cargo and passenger flights to the Middle East and to points within British India and China.

The airport facilities were further expanded in the 1980s to Terminal 2 and Terminal 3 respectively. The present day infrastructure of Jinnah International Complex is a result of an expansion programme carried out in 1994. Today, the new Jinnah Terminal handles both domestic and international flights, whereas Terminal 2 is now dedicated to Hajj operations. Terminal 1 (the original airport) is now the HQ of Pakistan's Civil Aviation Authority and Terminal 3 is dedicated to commercial offices.

Karachi was once a much busier airport. Between the 1960s and 1980s, it was an online station of several famous airlines of the world such as BOAC, Qantas, and Pan Am, featuring prominently on the latter's flagship around-the-world route. It served as PIA's primary international hub and saw direct flights to many international destinations on Pakistani metal, at a time when the airline was considered to be one of the foremost in the world. However, PIA's eventual decline in quality and ambition led to many routes being curtailed. Additionally, the emergence of Dubai's airport on the world map, increased usage of longer haul aircraft, and the poor political climate of Karachi during the 1990s, resulted in several airlines discontinuing their service to the airport. Recently, the situation has stabilised somewhat and several airlines have returned, although the airport is still nowhere near the service level of its heydays between the 60s-90s.

In March 2006, Pakistan International Airlines began serving Toronto nonstop from Karachi with Boeing 777s.

On 8 June 2014, 10 militants armed with automatic weapons, a rocket launcher, suicide vests and grenades attacked Jinnah International Airport. 36 people were killed, including all 10 attackers, and 18 others were wounded. Two aircraft of PIA (a Boeing 747 and an Airbus A310) and one Air Indus plane were reported to be damaged. The damage to the Air Indus aircraft was extensive, which rendered it non-operational, leading to the demise of the airline. Both PIA aircraft were subsequently written off.

Apart from getting 12 new boarding bridges in 2016, the airport hasn't seen any major expansion or upgrades to its structure since the opening of the Jinnah Terminal in 1992, although several airlines have installed auto-ticketing kiosks to facilitate travellers. PIA auto-ticketing kiosks are available round-the-clock, as well as staffed check-in counters open 24 hours.

Structure

Jinnah International Airport has a capacity of handling 12 million passengers annually. In fiscal year 2008–2009, over 5,725,052 passengers used Jinnah International Airport. 50,095 aircraft movements were registered.
It is a major focus city of Pakistan International Airlines (PIA), as the primary hub has shifted to Islamabad. All other Pakistani airlines also use Jinnah International Airport as their main hub. These include airblue,  SereneAir, Fly Jinnah, and AirSial as well as several charter carriers.
The building is linked via connecting corridors to two satellites, each having a provision of eight passenger-loading bridges. The eastern satellite is devoted exclusively to handling international operations. The western satellite is used for domestic operations, as well as some international operations. This is achieved through a flexible arrangement of gates. The two satellites supplement the departure lounges of the terminal building and also provide shopping facilities, mobile recharging points, and snack counters.

The Jinnah Terminal was completed in 1992 at a cost of US$100 million   – at the time the most expensive civil construction project in Pakistan. NESPAK (National Engineering Services Pakistan) and Airconsult (Frankfurt, Germany) were responsible for the architecture and planning of the terminal. Sogea Construction, a French company, was the contractor. Mukhtar Husain and Abdul Malik (NESPAK) were the Chief Engineers for the new terminal.
In Karachi, the CIP Lounge can be used by all first and business class passengers on all outbound flights. Barclays, UBL and airblue have also introduced their dedicated lounges in the international terminal of the airport.
There are a number of bank kiosks and ATMs that passengers can use at the airport. The airport is also where the majority of PIA's maintenance network is located, although some of its maintenance work also takes place at Islamabad International Airport, Islamabad. There are several hangars at the airport; the largest being the Ispahani Hangar (named after Mirza Ahmad Ispahani, the first chairman of PIA) that can accommodate two wide-body aircraft and one narrow body airliner (e.g. Boeing 737) at one time. On 15 February 2006, the first major overhaul of a Boeing 777-200ER aircraft (known as "C" check) was done at Ispahani Hangar. Most of the PIA aircraft are checked and regulated at the aircraft hangars in Karachi. The PIA maintenance also check other airline aircraft in Karachi. The head office of the Civil Aviation Authority of Pakistan is located in Terminal 1. Pakistan International Airlines has its head office on the grounds of the airport (PIA Building), as well as its central mainframe (CRC Building). CRC Building also houses the PIA frequent flyer programme, Awards +, as well as hosting SITA Bagtrak, the shared International Air Transport Association global lost luggage tracking computer network. PIA Engineering HQ, Cargo Village, Flight Kitchen, and PTC (PIA Training Centre) are also located here. Terminals 1 and Jinnah West also boast round-the-clock PIA booking offices and ticketing auto-kiosks.

Isphahani Hangar

The Isphahani Hangar is PIA's wide-body aircraft maintenance hangar at Jinnah International Airport. It has been named in honour of Mr. Mirza Ahmed Isphahani, the first and longest serving chairperson of Pakistan International Airlines from its inception in 1954 until 1962. The new jet hangar for wide-body and narrow-body aircraft with a supporting airframe overhaul shop was completed and commissioned in 1968. Most of the PIA aircraft are checked and regulated at the aircraft hangars in Karachi. The PIA maintenance also check other airline aircraft in Karachi such as Philippine Airlines, Yemenia and Turkish Airlines.

Terminals
Jinnah Airport has one main terminal, divided into two concourses and five floors:
The Jinnah East Satellite Concourse, used for international flights
The Jinnah West Satellite Concourse, used for domestic flights

Runways and aprons

The airport has two runways measuring 3,200m and 3,400m in length respectively. Runways 25R/07L and 25L/07R have a width of 46 m (150 ft) and 45m respectively. The runways are capable of handling up to Boeing 747-400, Airbus A350 XWB & Antonov An-225 Mriya aircraft. The runways have capacity to handle 15 flights per hour and can accommodate simultaneous landings and take offs. Runways 25R and 25L are equipped with ILS CAT-I to guide landing aircraft safely under very poor weather conditions and in low visibility conditions, such as fog. The taxiway is able to handle 12 aircraft at any one moment while the parking area measures 266,000 sq metres and is able to accommodate 42 aircraft, 12 of which through air bridges linking them directly with the terminal building. In addition to this, there are remote parking bays for 30 aircraft.

Airlines and destinations

Passenger 

: Air China's flight from Beijing to Karachi makes a stop-over at Islamabad but the flight from Karachi to Beijing is non-stop. Air China does not have eighth freedom rights to transport passengers solely between Karachi and Islamabad.

Cargo

Statistics
The following table provides details of the major traffic flows out of Karachi Airport in terms of passenger numbers, aircraft movements, cargo as well as mail. The results were collected by the Civil Aviation Authority of Pakistan:

Ground transport
Jinnah International Airport is situated near the highly populated areas of Gulistan-e-Jauhar and Malir. It is easily accessible through Shahrah-e-Faisal Road from any part of the city.

The Airport has a heptagon carpark which can accommodate more than 3000 vehicles.

Buses, mini buses and taxis are also available to the airport. There are also a number of traditional auto-rickshaws available at the airport parking area & entrance which are quite popular to travel short distances within the city.

Karachi Cantonment railway station is the nearest railway station from the airport to get the railway connections for the other parts of country. There is also a commuter rail station, Karachi Airport Station, which is located 2 km southwest of main Jinnah Terminal, just south of Star Gate.

Accidents and incidents

See also
 Pakistan Civil Aviation Authority
 Transport in Pakistan

References

External links

 Official website
 Jinnah International Airport at the Civil Aviation Authority of Pakistan
 Jinnah International Airport Information
 
 

 
Airports established in 1932
Airfields of the United States Army Air Forces Air Transport Command in the China-Burma-India Theater
Airfields of the United States Army Air Forces in British India
Memorials to Muhammad Ali Jinnah
1932 establishments in India